Jõetaguse may refer to several places in Estonia:

Jõetaguse, Ida-Viru County, village in Mäetaguse Parish, Ida-Viru County
Jõetaguse, Lääne-Viru County, village in Kadrina Parish, Lääne-Viru County